Rat-on-a-stick, also referred to as rat kebab, is a dish or snack consisting of a roasted rat served on a stick or skewer. The dish is consumed in Thailand and Vietnam. Prior to roasting, the rat is typically skinned and washed, after which it is gutted to remove its internal organs and then roasted.

By country
Rat meat is considered by some people in South Vietnam, east and northeast India and Thailand to be a delicacy, and in recent times, its popularity has increased in both countries. It is also served as a street food in these countries. Rat kebab became so popular it also started to appear in a number of elegant restaurants. Rat kebab is also a dish in some Cantonese recipes.

Source of rats
According to a BBC report, the rats are wild, and caught by professionals using traps.

In popular culture
Rat-on-a-stick has been consumed by contestants on the U.S. reality television show Survivor.

On 14 March 2019, Vietnamese rat meat has been featured on National Geographic.

See also
 List of meat dishes

Notes

References

Further reading

External links

 Street Eats, Cambodia: Mangosteen or Rat on a Stick?. Thefriendlygiraffe.com

Mice and rats in popular culture
Meat dishes